Lyme is a town along the Connecticut River in Grafton County, New Hampshire, United States. The population was 1,745 as of the 2020 census. Lyme is home to the Chaffee Natural Conservation Area. The Dartmouth Skiway is in the eastern part of town, near the village of Lyme Center. The Appalachian Trail passes through the town's heavily wooded eastern end.

History

 

This was once a home to Abenaki Indians, including a band of Sokokis near Post Pond at a place they called Ordanakis. Later, it would be another of many towns granted by colonial Governor Benning Wentworth along the Connecticut River in 1761. Many of the 63 grantees lived in Massachusetts and Connecticut, but virtually none of them ever settled in Lyme; they sold or assigned their grants to others. However, those settlers who did arrive in 1764 were mostly from those states. In the late 1770s, the town petitioned (ultimately unsuccessfully) to join Vermont.

The scenic town common is surrounded with houses and public buildings dating from the late 1700s to the early 1900s. Stagecoaches traveling the old "Boston Turnpike" from Montreal in the 1830s passed through Lyme, stopping at the Lyme Inn, built in 1809 and recently renovated. Next door to the inn is the 200-year-old Congregational church. Its original 1815 steeple bell was cast by Paul Revere. It was later replaced with a bell cast by Henry N. Cooper & Co., Boston. A hand-wound clock mechanism from E. Howard & Co. strikes the hour. Behind the church is a row of horse sheds dating from 1810. The row of 27 sheds standing today is the longest line of contiguous horse sheds in New England, and possibly in the United States. Originally each shed had the name of the owner on a sign above the door. The signs are still there, though not necessarily over the original shed.

Geography
Lyme is drained by Hewes, Grant, and Clay brooks, all flowing to the Connecticut River, which forms the western boundary of the town and the state border with Vermont.

Lyme is a rural town. Most human development is in the western half of the town along the Connecticut River and New Hampshire Route 10, known as the Dartmouth College Highway. The eastern half of the town is mostly forest. The town is home to four great ponds: Post Pond, Pout Pond, Trout Pond, and Reservoir Pond. Holts Ledge is a cliff that faces east and is part of the Dartmouth Skiway. The edge of the cliff is fenced to protect falcons. A fire tower, which was built in 1915, is visible from miles away atop Smarts Mountain and sets it apart from other local mountains. The Appalachian Trail crosses the summits of Holts Ledge and Smarts Mountain.

Demographics

As of the census of 2010, there were 1,716 people, 705 households, and 503 families residing in the town. The population density was 31.4 people per square mile (12.1/km2). There were 810 housing units at an average density of 14.8 per square mile (5.7/km2). The racial makeup of the town was 96.9% White, 0.3% African American, 0.3% Native American, 1.1% Asian, 0.3% some other race, and 1.0% from two or more races. Hispanic or Latino of any race were 2.4% of the population.

Of the 705 households, 28.5% had children under the age of 18 living with them, 61.3% were headed by married couples living together, 6.5% had a female householder with no husband present, and 28.7% were non-families. 23.5% of all households were made up of householders living alone, and 9.0% were someone living alone who was 65 years of age or older. The average household size was 2.42, and the average family size was 2.86.

In the town, the population was spread out, with 22.4% under the age of 18, 4.1% from 18 to 24, 19.5% from 25 to 44, 36.3% from 45 to 64, and 17.8% who were 65 years of age or older. The median age was 47.4 years. For every 100 females, there were 95.4 males. For every 100 females age 18 and over, there were 93.4 males.

Looking at the occupations of employed people in the town over the age of 16, the largest group - 50.9% - is education and health care. The next largest group - 9.6% - is professional, scientific, and management. Construction and manufacturing make up 8.4%; agriculture and forestry make up 0.7%.

For the period 2010 through 2014 the estimated median annual income for a household in the town was $110,781, and the median income for a family was $130,795. Males working full-time, year-round had a median income of $101,875 versus $58,125 for females. The per capita income for the town was $68,381. About 0.6% of families and 3.1% of the population were below the poverty line, including 3.2% of those age 65 or over.

Education

Lyme has two K–8 schools, one public and one independent.

There are currently around 200 students attending the Lyme School, the public K–8 school. As of 2018 the Lyme School has full day kindergarten. The school typically ranks in the top 5–10% of New Hampshire schools. Once a pupil reaches ninth grade, students from Lyme attend one of several high schools: Thetford Academy in Thetford, Vermont (across the Connecticut River), Hanover High School in Hanover, New Hampshire (about 10 miles south of Lyme), Hartford High School in Hartford, Vermont, Lebanon High School in Lebanon, New Hampshire, or St. Johnsbury Academy in St. Johnsbury, Vermont. Attendance is typically split between St. Johnsbury Academy, Thetford Academy and Hanover High, with the few remaining students going elsewhere.

Crossroads Academy, founded in 1991 as a K–8 school in Hanover, is now located on a wooded  campus at 95 Dartmouth College Highway in Lyme. It serves more than 140 students from a 50-mile radius in grades K–8 and employs 39 faculty and staff.

Sites of interest 
 Lyme Historians Museum
 Appalachian Trail
 Dartmouth Skiway

Notable people
Fred Hovey Allen (1845–1926), clergyman, author, pioneer in American art reproduction
Jonathan Child (1785–1860), first mayor of Rochester, New York
David Marston Clough (1846–1924), 13th governor of Minnesota
Amos P. Cutting (1839–1896), architect
Trina Schart Hyman (1939–2004), illustrator of children's books
Arthur Latham Perry (1830–1905), prominent American economist and advocate of free trade
Baxter E. Perry (1826–1906), second mayor of Medford, Massachusetts
Albert Cushing Read (1887–1967), commanded first trans-Atlantic seaplane flight (1919)
Mikaela Shiffrin (born 1995), alpine ski racer, US Olympic gold medalist

References

External links

 
 New Hampshire Economic and Labor Market Information Bureau Profile
 Converse Free Library
 Lyme Historians

 
Towns in Grafton County, New Hampshire
Populated places established in 1761
New Hampshire populated places on the Connecticut River
Towns in New Hampshire